Nongphadok Lakpa Atithi (English: The Guest)  is a 2019 Indian Meitei language film directed by Aribam Syam Sharma and produced by Deepak Sarmah. It stars Ningthoujam Rina and Lairenjam Olen in the lead roles. The film was premiered at the 3rd Guwahati International Film Festival 2019 as the Opening Film of the Indian section. It is based on Lamabam Viramani's short story Atithi. It was written as a radio play by M. K. Binodini Devi under the title Nongphadok Lakpada. The adapted screenplay of the film was done by Aribam Syam Sharma. It won four awards at the 13th Manipur State Film Festival 2020.

Nongphadok Lakpa Atithi was also the opening film at the 12th International Guwahati Film Festival 2020. It got official selection at the 5th North-East Film Festival, Pune (Fragrances from the North-East).

Synopsis
Tamubi had determined not to visit her estranged husband. Not even once in their twelve years of separation. But one day, all against herself, she visits to attend her daughter's wedding. She yielded to her daughter's persistence. When she arrives the estranged couple did not exchange a single word. As night falls after the ceremony, Tamubi has no choice but to hold the night at her husband's place. Reminiscence of the years gone by keep awake the separated husband and wife the whole night. The following day her husband pleads her to come back and start life anew. But Tamubi sticks to her independent conscience.

Cast
 Ningthoujam Rina as Tamubi
 Lairenjam Olen as Ibohal
 Kangabam Tomba as Mamma
 Redy Yumnam as Bijoy
 Chingtham Sarmila as Manimacha
 Yengkhom Roma as Angangjaobi
 Priyatama Aribam as Ebemnungsi

Accolades
Nongphadok Lakpa Atithi won four awards at the 13th Manipur State Film Awards 2020.

External links

References

2010s Meitei-language films
2019 films
Films directed by Aribam Syam Sharma